La Rivière (The River) is a lead or bronze sculpture by Aristide Maillol.

Location
There are examples at the Carrousel Garden, Paris; Citygarden, St. Louis, Missouri; Museum of Modern Art, New York City; the Norton Simon Museum in Pasadena; Talacker in Zurich; Kunsthalle Hamburg, Hamburg; and the Virginia Museum of Fine Arts, Richmond, Virginia.

References

External links

wtfArtHistory.com:  "A river stabbed in the back, La Rivière by Aristide Maillol"

Sculptures by Aristide Maillol
Sculptures of women
1943 sculptures
Lead sculptures
Nude sculptures
Sculptures of women in the United States
Outdoor sculptures in Greater Los Angeles
Nude sculptures in California
Sculptures of women in California
Sculptures of the Norton Simon Museum
Outdoor sculptures in France
Arts in Paris
Outdoor sculptures in Manhattan
Nude sculptures in New York (state)
Sculptures of women in New York City
Sculptures of the Museum of Modern Art (New York City)
Sculptures of women in Germany
Nude sculptures in Germany
Sculptures in Switzerland